Simeon Osuji Ekpe (9 April 1935– 16 March 2011, in Nwangele) was a Justice of the Court of Appeal of Nigeria and former Chief Judge of Imo State. Ekpe was educated at Bishop Shanahan College, Orlu and the University of London.

1934 births
2010 deaths
People from Imo State
Nigerian judges
Alumni of the University of London